Retrenchment is a technique associated with Formal Methods that was introduced to address some of the perceived limitations of formal, model based refinement, for situations in which refinement might be regarded as desirable in principle, but turned out to be unusable, or nearly unusable, in practice. It was primarily developed at the School of Computer Science, University of Manchester.

External links
The Retrenchment Homepage

Formal methods
Software development philosophies
Department of Computer Science, University of Manchester